VicScreen, formerly known as Film Victoria, is the Victorian Government’s creative and economic screen development agency. They function behind the scenes, supporting professionals, infrastructure, projects and events – elevating Victoria, Australia as a global screen destination. 

Early in 2022, Film Victoria rebranded to VicScreen, better representing the entire screen ecosystem and promoting Victoria as a world-leading centre for screen. They provide a range of support and services, including investing in production and content development. Industry placements, filming incentives, location assistance, skills training, industry events and more, working on "anything that boosts Victoria’s standing as a global screen powerhouse."  

In 2021, VicScreen and the Victorian Government announced Victoria’s Screen Industry Strategy 2021-2025, known as the VICSCREEN Strategy. The strategy was the Victorian Government’s first screen strategy in more than 10 years, setting a bold vision for Victoria’s screen industry. The VICSCREEN Strategy noted that in 2018–19 Victoria’s screen industry "contributed $2.2 billion in total gross value added and over 17,000 full time equivalent jobs to the Victorian economy. With $120.7 million in new funding from the 2021–22 State Budget, the VICSCREEN Strategy will guide the Victorian Government’s record $191.5 million investment to respond to global opportunities and challenges and transform Victoria’s screen industry over the next four years." 

In VicScreen's 2020/2021 Annual Report, they reported support for 114 projects across film, television and games projects, $391.4m amount spent in Victoria by supported projects that commenced production, equating to a return of $13 for every dollar invested*, and 9,558 employment opportunities generated for Victorians by these projects, equating to 2,788 direct full-time equivalent (FTE) jobs*.

History
Film Victoria was created as "a new statutory authority to be responsible for Government activities related to the production and distribution of film in Victoria including film for educational purposes", under an Act of the Victorian Parliament introduced by the Hon. Norman Lacy, Minister for the Arts, on 6 October 1981, known as the Film Victoria Act 1981.

The Act provided for Film Victoria to be established by the amalgamation of the Victorian Film Corporation (as it had been constituted initially in 1976), the State Film Centre and sections of the Audio Visual Resources Branch of the Education Department of Victoria. The purpose of the amalgamation was to avoid the unnecessary duplication of functions by the three organisations; to enhance the capacity of the Government to meet the present and future media needs of Victorians; to simplify access to film materials and to enlarge the benefits to be derived from the use of such materials.

In 1997 the functions of Film Victoria were amalgamated with those of the State Film Centre, to form Cinemedia Corporation, under the Cinemedia Corporation Act 1997. In 2001 the Cinemedia Corporation was abolished and Film Victoria and the Australian Centre for the Moving Image (ACMI) were established as separate statutory authorities. In 2017, the Victorian government’s screen agency appointed Caroline Pitcher as its new chief executive officer (CEO).

Early in 2022, Film Victoria rebranded to VicScreen, better representing the entire screen ecosystem and promoting Victoria as a world-leading centre for screen. They provide a range of support and services, including investing in production and content development. Industry placements, filming incentives, location assistance, skills training, industry events and more, working on "anything that boosts Victoria’s standing as a global screen powerhouse." 

According to VicScreen's website section 'About Us', their history includes the following timeline:
 1976: Established as the Victorian Film Corporation.
 1982: Became Film Victoria through the creation of Film Victoria Act 1981.
 1997: Integrated with the State Film Centre of Victoria, to form Cinemedia Corporation, under the Cinemedia Corporation Act 1997. 
 2001: Film Act 2001 abolished Cinemedia Corporation and established Film Victoria and the Australian Centre for the Moving Image (ACMI) as separate statutory authorities. 
 2015: Film Victoria integrated with Creative Victoria alongside government agencies across arts and culture, screen and design. 
 2021: Launch of Victoria’s Screen Industry Strategy 2021-2025, a whole of Victorian Government plan to reshape and expand Victoria’s screen industry.
 2022: Film Victoria re-branded to VicScreen, better reflecting the diversity of screen activity the agency supports, from film, television, online, VR and digital games.

See also
 Screen Australia
 South Australian Film Corporation
 Screen NSW
 Screen Queensland Studios, the production facility of Screen Queensland

References

External links 
 
 Creative Victoria, the sister agency for non-digital media investment

Film production companies of Australia
Government agencies of Victoria (Australia)